Kolkata West International City is a satellite township development of Kolkata, located at Salap in Howrah district. The project is under construction in the form of a joint-venture between KMDA and Singapore-based congomolarate Universal Success Group.

Project
The project was one of the largest foreign direct investments in township projects in India and the first in West Bengal. The Kolkata Metropolitan Development Authority acquired a 390-acre plot beside the Kona Expressway at Salap and handed it over to the consortium along with sub-leasing rights. It was unveiled by Buddhadeb Bhattacharya, the then Chief Minister of West Bengal, on 15 February 2006 and was expected to comprise about 11,000 apartments (flats/villas) to house nearly 36,000 people.

The first phase of the project was to span across 82 acres with the flats being priced between Rs 20 lakh and Rs 80 lakh. There were further plans to set up dedicated power stations, sports facilities, IT parks, entertainment zones, hospitals and schools. The first 450 units were to be sold over by December 2007 and the entire project, comprising five phases, was expected to be completed and delivered by 2010.

Opposition
An elite population of the city had initially demanded that the word ‘Kolkata’ be dropped from the name, as misleading. There was a barrage of criticism over Howrah Municipal Corporation agreeing to supply 2 million gallons of water per day to the project, amidst its general inability to sustain a proper water-supply to residential areas.

Delays 
The developers have missed numerous deadlines since 2008; 2013 not even half of the first phase work was completed. Salim Group and Ciputra Development went away soon after missing the first deadline.

The buyers have since formed an association -- Kolkata West Buyers' Welfare Association - to lodge protests against the supposed scam. A few flats were eventually provided with completion certificates from 2011 and onwards but were allegedly far from complete and constructed in a sub-optimal fashion. Multiple protests have been held since 2011.  In July 2011, Abhay Mohan Jha of HIMAL Southasian, made a visit to the proposed township and found it to be a desolated and uninhabited place, that resembled more of a cemetery. After being disallowed by the guards to enter the property, he visited the project-office in Chowringhee to find about 200 investors in a dharna, who despite having paid in full, were unable to move in, due to lack of any minimal infrastructure. Work progressed at a very slow pace and whilst more houses were eventually constructed, most of them had no connecting road or other basic facilities. The Association also protested by writing to West Bengal Chief Minister, Mamata Banerjee, but to no avail.

Universal Success Group has since blamed it on the delayed processing of "certain" approvals from various regulatory bodies like KMDA et al. KMDA though refuted the allegations and mentioned of the group being non-transparent when queried by them, about the reasons behind such extraordinary delays.

The Association has also filed a case against Kolkata West with the Competition Commission of India.

References

 http://thestatesman.net/index.php?option=com_content&view=article&id=361405&catid=42
 http://www.thestatesman.net/index.php?option=com_content&view=article&id=401316&catid=35
 http://epaper.sanmarg.in/PUBLICATIONS/SM/SM/2011/06/03/ArticleHtmls/03062011005011.shtml?Mode=undefined—Needs a login
 Hindustan Times
 Hindustan Times
 http://bartamanpatrika.com/archive/2011/june/030611/content/kolkata.htm
 http://www.thestatesman.net/index.php?id=370385&option=com_content&catid=42
 http://www.thestatesman.net/index.php?option=com_content&view=article&id=374626&catid=73

External links
 https://www.kolkatawest.in
https://www.joyvillehomes.com/joyville-howrah/
 Satellite view of site

Howrah district
Neighbourhoods in Kolkata